Karen Mirzoyan is a diplomat of Armenia and of the unrecognized Republic of Artsakh. From September 2012 until September 2017 he served as the Republic's Minister of Foreign Affairs.

Career

Foreign Minister
On June 6, 2013, Mirzoyan was interviewed by France24, and on July 24, 2014 Mirzoyan was interviewed by the European Times.

In September 2014, Mirzoyan led a diplomatic mission to the Basque Parliament. Mirzoyan met with Bakartxo Tejeria Otermin—speaker of the Basque Parliament. He also toured Guernica. The Basque Parliament and the Nagorno-Karabakh's legislature passed reciprocal motions recognizing one another's right to national autonomy.

Remaining Foreign Affairs Minister of the Republic of Artsakh (Nagorno-Karabakh), in March 2017, he visited Greece as part of an event hosted by the Armenian National Committee of Greece.

In September 2017, Karen Mirzoyan was succeeded as Foreign Minister of the Artsakh Republic by Masis Mayilyan.

Ambassador-at-large 

On June 28, 2019, he was appointed Ambassador-at-Large by Nikol Pashinyan.

On November 16, 2020, during the political crisis created by the 2020 Nagorno-Karabakh ceasefire agreement, he resigned from his post.

See also
List of foreign ministers in 2017
List of current foreign ministers
Foreign relations of Nagorno-Karabakh

References

External links

Official Biography by the government

Armenian diplomats
Living people
Politicians from the Republic of Artsakh
Year of birth missing (living people)
Place of birth missing (living people)